The 2012 United States House of Representatives elections in Arizona were held on Tuesday, November 6, 2012, to elect the nine U.S. representatives from the state, one from each of the state's nine congressional districts, including the newly-created 9th district following the 2010 United States census. The elections coincided with other federal and state elections, including a quadrennial presidential election, and a U.S. Senate election. Primary elections were held on August 28, 2012.

Overview
The table shows the number and percentage of votes, as well as the number of seats gained and lost, by each political party in the 2012 elections for the United States House of Representatives in Arizona.

Redistricting

Due to population gains reflected in the 2010 United States Census, Arizona's congressional delegation increased from eight members to nine in 2012. In accordance with the Arizona Constitution, the Arizona Independent Redistricting Commission produced new congressional district maps for use in the 2012 and subsequent elections. In October, 2011, the commission released a draft map and by November 5 that year had completed a round of public hearings for input on the draft map. The map became final after being cleared for compliance with the Voting Rights Act by the United States Department of Justice, and established the official district boundaries for the 2012 elections.

On November 1, 2011, Arizona Governor Jan Brewer, with the approval of the Arizona Senate, removed Colleen Mathis, the commission's chair, charging Mathis was guilty of "failure to apply the Arizona Constitution's redistricting provisions in an honest, independent and impartial fashion." On November 17, the Arizona Supreme Court overturned Brewer's decision and reinstated Mathis. On November 21, Brewer asked the Supreme Court to reconsider its decision and to temporarily reverse Mathis' reinstatement. The Supreme Court refused. The map was pre-cleared by the U.S. Department of Justice on April 9, 2012, and was effect for the 2012 elections.

District 1

Based upon the new map, the 1st district is slightly friendlier to Democrats than its predecessor. Incumbent Republican Paul Gosar, first elected in 2010, ran for election in the more conservative 4th district.

Republican primary

Candidates

Nominee
 Jonathan Paton, state senator and nominee for the 8th district in 2010

Eliminated in primary
 Patrick Gatti
 Gaither Martin
 Douglas Wade, contractor

Declined
Paul Gosar, incumbent U.S. Representative
Bill Konopnicki, former state Representative
Gary Pierce, member of the Arizona Corporation Commission

Primary results

Democratic primary

Candidates

Nominee
 Ann Kirkpatrick, former U.S. representative

Eliminated in primary
 Wenona Benally Baldenegro, attorney and member of the Navajo Nation

Withdrawn
Miguel Olivas, government consultant and former staffer for former U.S. Representative Rick Renzi

Primary results

Baldenegro would have been the first Native American woman to serve in Congress had she had won the seat.

Libertarian primary

Candidates

Nominee
Kim Allen

Primary results

General election

Endorsements

Polling

Predictions

Results

District 2

After redistricting, most of 2nd district was composed of land previously located in the 8th district and was thus more favorable to Democrats. Democrat Gabby Giffords, who had represented the 8th district since 2007, was seriously wounded in a mass shooting in January 2011 and resigned her congressional seat in January 2012. A special election was held in June 2012 under the boundaries of the then current 8th district, with a primary election held in April 2012; in November 2012 another election took place under the new boundaries of the 2nd district, with a primary scheduled for August 2012.

Democratic primary

Candidates

Nominee
 Ron Barber, incumbent U.S. Representative

Eliminated in primary
 Matt Heinz, state representative

Withdrawn
Paula Aboud, state senator
Steve Farley, state representative
Nomiki Konst, journalist and University of Arizona alumna

Primary results

Republican primary

Candidates

Nominee
 Martha McSally, retired U.S. Air Force Colonel and candidate for the 8th District in 2012 (special)

Eliminated in primary
 Mark Koskiniemi

Withdrawn
Frank Antenori, state senator 
Jesse Kelly, U.S. Marine Corps veteran and nominee for the in 8th District in 2010 and 2012 (special)

Declined
John Lervold, U.S. Army veteran and interrogation instructor at Fort Huachuca
Dave Sitton, sports announcer for the University of Arizona and candidate for the 8th District in 2012 (special)

Primary results

Libertarian primary

Candidates

Nominee
Anthony Powell

General election

Endorsements

Predictions

Results

District 3

In the October 2011 redistricting, most of the 7th district became the 3rd district and was more favorable to Democrats. Incumbent Democrat Raúl M. Grijalva, first elected in 2002, said in February 2011 that he had no plans to run for the U.S. Senate.

Democratic primary

Candidates

Nominee
 Raul Grijalva, incumbent U.S. Representative

Eliminated in primary
 Amanda Aguirre, former state senator
 Manny Arreguin, OB/GYN

Withdrawn
David Crowe Robles, defense contractor

Primary results

Republican primary

Candidates

Nominee
 Gabriela Saucedo Mercer, conservative activist

Eliminated in primary
 Jaime Vasquez, businessman,

Declined
 Ruth McClung, nominee for the 7th district in 2010

Primary results

Libertarian primary

Candidates

Nominee
Blanca Guerra

Primary results

General election

Endorsements

Results

District 4

The new 4th congressional district encompasses most of the rural areas in the old 2nd district, as well as significant portions of the old 1st, 5th, and 6th districts, according to the final maps of the Arizona Independent Redistricting Commission. The district is heavily-Republican.

Paul Gosar, who has represented the 1st district since 2011 moved to Prescott in order to run in this district.

Republican primary

Campaign
Babeu dropped his congressional bid on May 11, 2012, instead seeking re-election as sheriff. This came after he was accused of being lovers with an undocumented immigrant who he threatened with deportation to guarantee his silence. The Arizona solicitor general would later exonerate Babeu after an investigation.

Candidates

Nominee
Paul Gosar, incumbent U.S. Representative for the 1st District

Eliminated in primary
Ron Gould, state senator
Rick Murphy, founder and owner of Murphy Broadcasting

Withdrawn
Paul Babeu, sheriff of Pinal County

Primary results

Democratic primary

Candidates

Nominee
Johnnie Robinson

Eliminated in primary
Mikel Weisser, author and political activist

Primary results

Libertarian primary

Candidates

Nominee
Joe Pamelia, aerospace and defense professional

Primary results

Americans Elect primary

Candidates

Nominee
Richard Grayson, writer, political activist and performance artist

Primary results

General election

Results

District 5

With the October 2011 redistricting, most of the 6th district became the 5th district and continued to favor Republicans. Incumbent Republican Jeff Flake, who has represented this district since 2001, sought the Republican nomination for the U.S. Senate.

Republican primary

Candidates

Nominee
 Matt Salmon, former U.S. Representative

Eliminated in primary
 Kirk Adams, former speaker of the Arizona House of Representatives

Withdrawn
Chuck Gray, former majority leader of the Arizona Senate 
Travis Grantham, Arizona Air National Guard captain

Declined
Jeff Flake, incumbent U.S. Representative
Russell Pearce, former president of the state senate

Primary results

Democratic primary

Candidates

Nominee
 Spencer Morgan, student at Mesa Community College

Primary results

General election

Endorsements

Results

District 6

After redistricting, the bulk of David Schweikert's 5th district became the 9th district, while his home in Fountain Hills was drawn into the newly created 4th district. However, as soon as the maps were released, Schweikert announced he would run in the 6th district. That district had previously been the 3rd, represented by fellow Republican freshman Ben Quayle. However, in a statement announcing his re-election plans, Schweikert pointed out that he'd grown up in Scottsdale—most of which had been drawn into the 6th as well—had represented it in both the state house and in Congress, and owned a second home there. A revised map, however, placed Schweikert's home in Fountain Hills into the reconfigured 6th. Quayle, whose home in Phoenix had been drawn into the 9th but was just outside the boundaries of the 6th, opted to seek re-election in the 6th as well.

Republican primary

Campaign
During the bitter primary campaign, Schweikert was widely criticised for a mailer that accused Quayle of "going both ways", suggesting that he was bisexual. On the reverse, the mailer listed issues on which it claimed Quayle had taken both liberal and conservative positions. Senator Jon Kyl said that "such campaign tactics insult the voters, degrade politics and expose those who stoop to them as unworthy of high office" and Senator John McCain said the mailer was one of the "worst that I have seen" and that it "crosses the boundary of decent political dialogue and discourse". Quayle's spokeswoman called the mailer "utterly false" and "a sleazy smear tactic". Schweikert's spokesman responded that people "should get their minds out of the gutter" because the mailer was "obviously" referring to "'both ways' – as in liberal and conservative". The Arizona Republic asked two political scientists to review the mailer, who both said that they had "never seen anybody accuse someone of flip-flopping [on political issues] that way" and said that it was "difficult to believe" that the sexual suggestion was unintentional.

Candidates

Nominee
 David Schweikert, incumbent  U.S. Representative from the 5th District

Eliminated in primary
 Ben Quayle, incumbent U.S. Representative from the 3rd District

Primary results
Although the 6th contained almost two-thirds of Quayle's constituents, Schweikert defeated Quayle in the Republican primary—the real contest in this heavily Republican district—by 51.5 percent to Quayle's 48.5 percent.

Democratic primary

Candidates

Nominee
 Matt Jette, business professor at the Thunderbird School of Global Management & Republican candidate for Governor in 2010

Eliminated in primary
 W. John Williamson

Primary results

Libertarian primary

Candidates

Nominee
Jack Anderson

Primary results

Green primary

Candidates

Nominee
Mark Salazar

Primary results

General election

Results

District 7

In accordance with the redrawn boundaries, most of the 4th district became the 7th district and remained the most Democratic district in Arizona. Incumbent Democrat Ed Pastor considered a run for the U.S. Senate but decided against it.

State senator Kyrsten Sinema, who considered a bid for Congress and lived in the former 4th district, opted to run in the 9th district.

Democratic primary

Candidates

Nominee
Ed Pastor, incumbent U.S. Representative

Eliminated in primary
Rebecca DeWitt

Declined
Kyrsten Sinema, state senator

Primary results

Republican primary

Candidates

Eliminated in primary
Scott Fistler, perennial candidate

Declined
José Peñalosa, attorney and candidate for 4th district in 2010

Primary results
Fistler did not receive enough write-in votes to appear on the general election ballot as a Republican.

Libertarian primary

Candidates

Nominee
Joe Cobb

Primary results

General election

Results

District 8

With the new map, most of the Maricopa County portion of the old 2nd district was renumbered as the 8th district and made more favorable to Republicans. Incumbent Republican Trent Franks, who had considered running for the U.S. Senate, instead ran for re-election.

Republican primary

Candidates

Nominee
Trent Franks, incumbent U.S. Representative

Eliminated in primary
Tony Passalacqua, Navy Veteran

Primary results

Democratic primary

Candidates

Nominee
Gene Scharer

Primary results

Americans Elect primary

Candidates

Nominee
Stephen Dolgos

Primary results

General election

Results

District 9

With the new map, most of the old 5th District became the 9th District. It now encompassed portions of southern Phoenix, as well as all of Tempe and parts of Scottsdale, Mesa, Chandler and Paradise Valley. It was not considered safe for either party.

Democratic primary

Candidates

Nominee
 Kyrsten Sinema, state senator

Eliminated in primary
 Andrei Cherny, former Arizona Democratic Party chairman
 David Schapira, minority leader of the Arizona Senate

Declined
Neil Giuliano, former Mayor of Tempe
Jon Hulburd, lawyer, small businessman and nominee for the 3rd district in 2010
Harry Mitchell, former U.S. Representative

Primary results

Republican primary

Candidates

Nominee
 Vernon Parker, former Mayor of Paradise Valley

Eliminated in primary
 Lisa Borowsky, Scottsdale city councilwoman
 Leah Campos Schandlbauer, former CIA officer
 Travis Grantham, Air Force veteran
 Wendy Rogers, Air Force veteran
 Martin Sepulveda, former Chandler city councilman
 Jeff Thompson, former businessman

Withdrawn
Don Stapley, member of the Maricopa County Board of Supervisors

Declined
Sal DiCiccio, member of the Phoenix City Council;
Hugh Hallman, Mayor of Tempe 
Steve Moak, businessman and candidate for the 3rd district in 2010 
Gary Pierce, member of the Arizona Corporation Commission 
Ben Quayle, incumbent U.S. Representative for the 5th District

Primary results

Libertarian primary

Primary results

General election

Endorsements

Polling

Predictions

Results
Kyrsten Sinema was officially declared the winner on November 12, 2012

References

External links
 Elections at the Arizona Secretary of State
 Official candidate list
 United States House of Representatives elections in Arizona, 2012 at Ballotpedia
 Arizona U.S. House at OurCampaigns.com
 Campaign contributions for U.S. Congressional races in Arizona at OpenSecrets
 Outside spending at the Sunlight Foundation

United States House of Representatives
Arizona
2012